The World Design Organization (WDO) was founded in 1957 from a group of international organizations focused on industrial design. Formerly known as the International Council of Societies of Industrial Design, the WDO is a worldwide society that promotes better design around the world. Today, the WDO includes over 170 member organizations in more than 40 nations, representing an estimated 150,000 designers.

The primary aim of the association is to advance the discipline of industrial design at an international level. To do this, WDO undertakes a number of initiatives of global appeal to support the effectiveness of industrial design in an attempt to address the needs and aspirations of people around the world, to improve the quality of life, as well as help to improve the economy of nations throughout the world.

History
Jacques Viénot first presented the idea to form a society to represent the industrial designers internationally at the Institut d’Esthetique Industrielle's international congress in 1953. The International Council of Societies of Industrial Designers was formally founded at a meeting in London on June 29, 1957. The name of Icsid demonstrates the spirit which is to protect the interests of practicing designers and to ensure global standards of design. The individuals first elected officials to the Executive Board therefore did not act upon personal conviction, but represented the voice of society members and the international design community.

The organization then officially registered in Paris and set up their headquarters there.  Icsid's early goals were to help public awareness of industrial designers, to raise the standard of design by setting standards for training and education, and to encourage cooperation between industrial designers worldwide.  To do this, in 1959 Icsid held the first Congress and General Assembly in Stockholm, Sweden. At this first Congress the Icsid Constitution was officially adopted, along with the first definition of industrial design which may be found on their website (please see external references).  During this Congress, Icsid's official name was changed from the International Council of Societies of Industrial Designers to the International Council of Societies of Industrial Design to reflect that the organization would involve itself beyond matters of professional practice.

Throughout Icsid had continued to grow and now has members from all over the world in both capitalist and non-capitalist countries. Icsid has now hosted the Congress in places such as Venice, Paris, Vienna, Montreal, Slovenia, Glasgow, Taipei, Toronto, Sydney, Kyoto and London.

In 1963, Icsid was granted special status with UNESCO, with whom Icsid continues to work on many projects, using design for the betterment of the human condition.  As their humanitarian interests grew, Icsid decided to create a new type of conference that would join industrial designers in a host country to study a problem of both regional and international significance. This new conference held in Minsk in 1971, became the first Icsid Interdesign seminar. These seminars provided opportunities for professional development of mid-career practicing designers, and to allow them to focus their abilities on resolving issues of international significance.  This first Interdesign conference and the ones that followed, consolidated Icsid's position as a driving force of international collaboration.

In 1971, the 7th Congress of the International Council of Societies of Industrial Design (ICSID), organised by the Agrupació de Disseny Industrial del Foment de les Arts Decoratives (ADI/FAD) in Eivissa (Ibiza), turned out to be an event without precedent in Spain: a process of socialisation and an example of how the energy of collaborative work, vitality, intellectual reflection and leisure can be placed at the service of dialogue-based projects with the capacity to generate imaginative approaches and structure new behavioural patterns.

In 1974, the Icsid Secretariat moved from Paris, France, to Brussels, Belgium, moving onto Helsinki, Finland, and in 2005, it settled to Montreal, Quebec, Canada, where it currently resides.

In the 1980s, collaboration became even more important so a joint Icsid/Icograda/IFI Congress was held in Helsinki. The impetus for this joint conference was a direct recommendation made by Icsid members to explore closer ties with other world design organizations. At their General Assemblies, all participants unanimously approved a directive to investigate options for a closer working relationship in the future.  These organizations then joined with UNESCO to bring together doctors, industrial and graphic designers, and assistants to develop basic furniture for rural health centers, packaging, transport, refrigeration, and injection of vaccines and the design of data collecting devices for field use.

In 2003, Icsid and Icograda ratified an agreement between both organizations during their respective General Assemblies to form the International Design Alliance, a multidisciplinary partnership that supports design. In 2008, the IDA partners welcomed a third member, IFI (International Federation of Interior Architects/Designers). Together in 2011, all three partners held a historical joint Congress in Taipei, Taiwan called the IDA Congress. The alliance was terminated in November 2013.

In 2017, in January the Icsid officially became the World Design Organization (WDO).

Executive Board
The WDO Executive Board is the governing body that directs and supports the WDO's mission and vision. It is composed of international industrial design professionals selected by WDO members during the General Assembly. A total of 11 members make up the Executive Board: President, President-elect, and 9 Executive Board members. Each board member serves a two-year term and may be re-elected for a second term, but cannot run for a third term, unless running for President-Elect.

President-elect 
The President-elect is designated as the future President of WDO in the following term.

Treasurer
A treasurer is appointed by the President for each new term. The Treasurer's role is to keep record of Icsid's finances throughout the two-year term.

Senate
The Senate is composed of past Presidents of the WDO Executive Board, acting as an advisory board. Its eldest member is Kenji Ekuan (Icsid President 1975–1977), an industrial designer most-renowned for creating the soy sauce bottle design. The most current past President serves as the Convenor of the Senate until the next General Assembly, Prof. Soon-in Lee (Icsid President 2011–2013) is the current convenor.

Regional Advisors
Regional Advisors are former Icsid Executive Board Members who are appointed to represent Icsid through regional events and strengthen the organization's global presence.

Secretariat
The Secretariat team facilitates the exchange of ideas within the design community by implementing a range of projects and initiatives, and raises awareness of the power of industrial design to effect positive change in the world. The Secretariat office has been previously located in Paris, Brussels, and Helsinki. Since 2005, the office is located in Montreal, Quebec, Canada.

Members 
WDO Members are professional associations, promotional societies, educational institutions, government bodies, corporations and institutions, which aim to contribute to the development of the profession of industrial design. These societies collaborate to establish an international platform through which design institutions worldwide can stay in touch, share common interests and new experiences, and be heard as a powerful voice.

World Design Congress
Since its first Congress in 1959 held in Stockholm, Sweden, the World Design Congress was the WDO's most notable biennial international industrial design event. A host city is chosen through a bidding process, followed by a program in which keynote speakers, panellists and workshops are developed during the three-day event. The Congress was open to all those interested in industrial design, including WDO members.

IDA Congress
In 2011, the International Design Alliance have agreed to replace their individual Congresses to a joint biennale Congress under the multidisciplinary banner of the IDA Congress. A joint model was previously held every six years since 1981, starting in Helsinki, Finland. The joint Congresses were then followed by Amsterdam, The Netherlands in 1987; Glasgow, Scotland in 1993; Sydney, Australia in 1999; and Copenhagen, Prague in 2005.

Taipei, Taiwan was selected as the host city for the inaugural 2011 IDA Congress. Each organisation still holds their individual General Assemblies after the IDA Congress.  After the Taipei congress, the International Design Alliance unveiled a new branding identity for its biennial congress which each host city will be able to use and personalise their identity to showcase their unique cultures.

General Assembly
The WDO General Assembly is an WDO member-only event in which member organizations discuss refinements to the Constitution and By-laws, elect a new executive board for the upcoming term, ratify new members, and update the membership on the work done in the past term through the previous executive board's direction.

Programmes

World Design Capital
Under the WDO's direction, the World Design Capital programme is a biennial designation given to a city who has proven through the use of design in revitalizing urban areas whilst also promoting innovative design. Through this initiative, the city of Torino, Italy was designated as the first World Design Capital in 2008. With the help of WDO, a yearly program is conceived to engage the city in signature World Design Capital events including galas and exhibitions.

Several processes are performed prior to designating the city, including a call for submissions, an evaluation of the submissions, a shortlist of cities, a city visit and a final selection process. A selection committee is appointed to shortlist the cities and the WDC Organizing Committee chooses the designated city.

The current World Design Capital network:
 World Design Capital 2008 Torino
 World Design Capital 2010 Seoul
 World Design Capital 2012 Helsinki
 
 World Design Capital 2016 Taipei
 World Design Capital 2018 Mexico City
 World Design Capital 2020 Lille Metropole
 World Design Capital 2022 Valencia

World Design Impact Prize
The World Design Impact Prize was developed to award a socially-responsible design project or initiative, in which design proves or could potentially prove to enrich or improve quality of life on a social, environmental, cultural or economic scale. This biennial award aims to promote and recognise projects that are industrial design driven and use design for social good.

The inaugural World Design Impact Prize was awarded in Helsinki at the World Design Capital (WDC) International Design Gala in February 2012. It was presented to the Community Cooker Project from Nairobi.

The second cycle of the World Design Impact Prize was launched on 9 April 2013 with a new identity and a call for public suggestions. The International Review Panel was composed of five international representatives including three WDO Members and two experienced professionals in the field of design for social good

The nominations period for the WDO Membership was from 29 June – 29 July 2013 and the nominated projects were announced on 10 September 2013. 26 projects from 15 countries completed applications and are showcased on the World Design Impact Prize website.

The Review Panel collectively shortlisted seven projects, which were announced at the WDO General Assembly on 18 November 2013 in Montreal (Canada). The quality of the projects nominated in the second cycle pushed the Review Panel to select seven projects, instead of six as originally intended. The shortlisted projects (in alphabetical order) were:
 A Behaviour Changing (ABC) Syringe
 BioLite HomeStove
 Family by Family
 Laddoo Project
 Leveraged Freedom Chair 
 Potty Project
 Refugee Housing Unit

These projects were selected on the criteria of impact, innovation, context and ease of use and because they promoted an expanded view of the field of industrial design.

Three finalists will be announced on 27 January 2014 and the award will be presented at the World Design Capital International Design Gala in Cape Town (South Africa) in February 2014.

WDO Interdesign
An intensive two-week workshop, Interdesign is a collaboration between international designers and local experts to discuss a design issue and seek solutions for implementation. Since 1971, the first Interdesign was held in Minsk, USSR (now Belarus), where thirty designers worked on the product-oriented subject of bread making.

In 2014, WDO Interdesign under the theme of 'Humanising Metropolis' will take place in Mumbai (India), on 5–19 February. Following the call for applications, the participants list is to be announced in the mid-December 2013.

World Industrial Design Day
This annual day of observance is held every 29 June, WDO's anniversary, for industrial designers, academics, design students and non-designers impacted by the power if industrial design on a daily basis. This day of observance promotes awareness and the celebration of industrial design, encouraging WDO Members and non-members to hold events such as exhibitions, panels, workshops, open houses and other social functions.

From 2009 to 2011, an annual student poster competition was held for WDO's Educational student members to participate; this activity concluded once the official World Industrial Design Day logo was introduced by WDO.  Each year, a theme is determined by the WDO Board of Directors and announced months in advance of 29 June in order for companies, associations, design schools and design agencies to plan their activities and outreach.

World Design Talks
The WDO World Design Talks were established in 2016 and consist or a series of workshops "that address local challenges with global relevance—such as rapid urbanization, climate change, and migration—from a design perspective." The wisdom that comes out of the World Design Talks helps define who the WDO are and address their relationship to the United Nations Sustainable Development Goals.

References

Publications

External links
Icsid website
Icsid Archive at the University of Brighton Design Archives
World Design Capital website
World Design Impact Prize

Industrial design
Design institutions
International trade associations
Organizations established in 1957
International organizations based in Canada